Kenneth David "Lum" Snyder (August 12, 1930 – October 1985) was an American football offensive lineman in the National Football League who played for the Philadelphia Eagles from 1952 through  1955 and in 1958.  He was named to the Pro Bowl two times. Snyder attended Georgia Tech.

1930 births
1985 deaths
American football offensive linemen
Georgia Tech Yellow Jackets football players
Philadelphia Eagles players
Eastern Conference Pro Bowl players